was a Japanese photographer.

Fujimoto's works are in the permanent collection of the Tokyo Metropolitan Museum of Photography.

Iida City Museum runs a photographic contest, Fujimoto Shihachi Shashin Bunka-shō, in his honour.

References

Japanese photographers
1911 births
2006 deaths
Recipients of the Medal with Purple Ribbon